This is a list of settlements in Cambridgeshire by population based on the results of the 2011 census. The next United Kingdom census will take place in 2021. In 2011, there were 22 built-up area subdivisions with 5,000 or more inhabitants in Cambridgeshire, shown in the table below.

Population ranking

See also 
 Cambridgeshire

References 

Settlements by population
Cambridgeshire-related lists
Cambridgeshire